Louis Edward Murphy (September 24, 1913 – 1995) was Canadian politician. He served in the Legislative Assembly of New Brunswick from 1978 to 1995 as a Liberal member from the constituency of Saint John Harbour.

References

1913 births
1995 deaths
New Brunswick Liberal Association MLAs